Kamlesh Shah is an Indian politician and a member of the Indian National Congress party.

Career

Political career
He became an MLA in 2013.

He is the MLA of Amarwara (Vidhan Sabha constituency) and visits the villages and interacts with villages about the development works carried out in this region.

Political views
He supports Congress Party's Ideology.

Personal life
He is married to Mrs. Madhvi Shah.

See also
Madhya Pradesh Legislative Assembly
2013 Madhya Pradesh Legislative Assembly election
2008 Madhya Pradesh Legislative Assembly election

References

Indian National Congress politicians
1972 births
Living people
Indian National Congress politicians from Madhya Pradesh